Inroads may refer to:

 Inroads (organization), an American organization that offers internships
 Inroads (album), a 1986 album by Béla Fleck